If You're Not Dead, Play is a 2005 PBS rock music documentary, a Western Reserve Public Media/ PBS production and the sequel of It's Everything, And Then It's Gone.

This was also written and directed by Phil Hoffman. It provides the follow-up explanation of how the Akron Sound came to be with the second wave of Ohioan punk rock and new wave music bands who emerged in the 1980s, including Chi-Pig, Unit 5, and Hammer Damage.

External links
 If You're Not Dead, Play Video on YouTube

Rockumentaries
2005 in music
Culture of Akron, Ohio